Surakudipatti is a village in the Thanjavur taluk of Thanjavur district, Tamil Nadu, India.

Demographics 

As per the 2001 census, Surakudipatti had a total population of 823 with 395 males and 428 females. The literacy rate was 59.09.

References 

 

Villages in Thanjavur district